SRR can stand for:
 Savannah River Remediation, involved in waste operations at Savannah River Site
 Search and rescue region
 Shake, Rattle & Roll (film series), a Filipino horror anthology film series
 Shake, Rattle and Roll, a song by Jesse Stone
 SRR IPC, a Linux message-passing project
 Serer language, a language with ISO 639 code srr
 Serine racemase, an enzyme encoded by the SRR gene
 Short Range Radar for cars
 Sierra Blanca Regional Airport, Ruidoso, New Mexico, US, IATA Code
 Societad Retorumantscha, a Swiss language association
 Russian Amateur Radio Union, СРР (Cyrillic) or SRR
 Special Reconnaissance Regiment of UK Special Forces
 Split-ring resonator in metamaterials
 Design review (U.S. government)#System Requirements Review (SRR) of military project
 Socialist Republic of Romania Socialist country in Eastern Europe during the cold war